Paul Bickford Huber (1934-June 24, 2021) was an American economist and professor of economics at Dalhousie University (1965-1998). He served as a member of the Executive Board of the Association of Dalhousie Retirees and Pensions (ADRP).

References

1934 births
2021 deaths
20th-century American historians
American male non-fiction writers
20th-century American economists
20th-century American male writers
Yale University alumni
Academic staff of the Dalhousie University